The Kuala Pilah District is a district in central Negeri Sembilan, Malaysia. Its seat is the town of Kuala Pilah.

Kuala Pilah District borders Jelebu District to the north, Jempol District to the east, Tampin District to the southwest and Rembau and Seremban Districts to the west.

Administrative divisions

Kuala Pilah District is divided into 11 mukims, which are:
 Ampang Tinggi
 Johol
 Juasseh
 Kepis
 Langkap
 Parit Tinggi
 Pilah (Capital)
 Seri Menanti
 Terachi
 Ulu Jempol
 Ulu Muar

The district also home to Seri Menanti, the official residence of the Yang di-Pertuan Besar of Negeri Sembilan.

Demographics

Federal Parliament and State Assembly Seats 

List of Kuala Pilah district representatives in the Federal Parliament (Dewan Rakyat) 

List of Kuala Pilah district representatives in the State Legislative Assembly (Dewan Undangan Negeri)

See also
 Districts of Malaysia

References